Escapade or Escapades may refer to:

Transportation
HMS Escapade, a 1934 Royal Navy destroyer that served in World War II
Just Escapade, an American two-seat kit-built light aircraft

Films
Escapade (1932 film), an American crime film directed by Richard Thorpe
Escapade (1935 film), starring William Powell and Luise Rainer
Escapade (1936 film), a German romantic comedy film
Escapade (1951 film), or Atoll K, a Laurel and Hardy film
Escapade (1955 film), featuring John Mills
Escapade (1957 film), with Louis Jourdan

Music

Classical
Escapades for two violins, Dick Kattenburg
Escapades, David Dubery
Escapades, concerto for alto saxophone & orchestra John Williams

Bands
Escapade (band), an American rock band
The Escapades, an American garage rock band

Albums
Escapades (Gaspard Augé album), 2021
Escapades (Hungry Kids of Hungary album)
Escapade (James Spaulding album), 1999
Escapade (Tim Finn album), 1983
Escapades, album by Christine Atallah 2006
Escapades, album by Dreadzone
Escapades, album by Gem 2006
Escapades, album by Harold Danko 2009

Songs
"Escapade" (song), by Janet Jackson
"Escapades" (song), by Azealia Banks

Literature
 Escapade (play), a 1952 play by Roger MacDougall

Television
Escapade, an early 1980s cable television network featuring adult content that became The Playboy Channel

Spacecraft
 EscaPADE, a Mars orbiter slated for launch in 2024 to study interactions between its atmosphere and the solar wind